Sukehiro (written: 祐弘 or 輔煕) is a masculine Japanese given name. Notable people with the name include:

 (born 1942), Japanese diplomat
 (1807–1878), Japanese kugyō

Fictional characters 
Yami Sukehiro, a character in Black Clover

Japanese masculine given names